Alfred Hui Ting-hang (born 29 April 1988) is a Hong Kong singer and dentist. He rose to prominence as the eleventh-place finalist in the first season of The Voice. His debut studio album Departure Trilogy earned gold certification. Hui won multiple best newcomer awards in 2011. He has since released more than ten studio albums.

Hui holds a Bachelor of Dental Surgery from the University of Hong Kong, and is licensed by the Dental Council of Hong Kong since 2012.

Early life 
Alfred Hui Ting-hung was born on April 29, 1988 in Hong Kong. His father is Hui Yee Yung and Alfred has two older sisters and an older brother. His father was the vice-chairman of the Hong Kong Kidney Foundation. As a child, Hui aspired to be a doctor. Hui decided to pursue dentistry after job shadowing at his uncle's dental clinic for two weeks. Hui graduated from the German Swiss International School, in Hong Kong. He attended The University of Hong Kong, and was named HKU Sports Scholar in Soccer in 2007. Hui graduated with a Bachelor in Dental Surgery in 2012.

Singing career 
In 2009, Hui competed in the singing competition television series The Voice. Hui won the Most Popular Award, and placed eleventh in the competition. Hui signed with TVB as a recording artist and debuted with the song "My Departure Is Also A Kind Of Love", the ending song to television series Gun Metal Grey.

On 4 March 2011, Alfred Hui signed a contract with Stars Shine International as a singer. On 28 June 2011, he released his debut studio album A Trilogy of Departure.  On 16 August 2011, Hui headlined his first music concert. The single "Departure" peaked at number one on the 903 Ultimate Song Chart and Jade Solid Gold music chart. Hui swept newcomer awards in 2011, winning Best Newcomer Gold Prize at the Ultimate Song Chart Awards Presentation, Best Newcomer at the Metro Radio Hits Music Awards, Best Prospects Bronze Prize at the RTHK Top 10 Gold Songs Awards, and Most Popular Newcomer (Gold) at JSG Awards Presentation.

Hui released his second studio album Blue on January 12, 2012.

Hui represented Hong Kong to participate in the ABU TV Song Festival 2012, which was scheduled to take place at the KBS Concert Hall, in Seoul, South Korea, on 14 October 2012.

His third studio album Grandit, meaning "growing up" in French, was released in December 2012. The title track "Grandit" was released to radio on 5 September 2012 and managed to garner top places in music charts of RTHK, Metro Radio and TVB. The single "The Ode of Youth", which echoes the theme of the song "Grandit" and serves as the conclusion of the album, received critical acclaim. It was released to radio on 21 February 2013. Commercially, the song remained as No.1 on Commercial Radio's music chart for two consecutive weeks, breaking a record that was held for seven years. In a radio interview, Hui revealed that the song was originally not intended to be released as a single. The result was a surprise to him.

On 31 October 2013, Alfred Hui followed Herman Ho Chit-to, Chief Executive Officer of Stars Shine, to join the Voice Entertainment Group Limited. His contract was then transferred to the new company. On 20 December 2013, Hui released a compilation album The Times. On 28 and 29 December 2013, The Times – Alfred Hui Solo Concert 2013 (許廷鏗時光演唱會2013) was organized at the Star Hall of Kowloonbay International Trade & Exhibition Centre.

On December 7, 2014, Alfred Hui's two singles "Chain" and "Blessing" ranked second and tenth respectively on the Jade Solid Gold music chart. His singles "Shelter" and "If You Were Me" also attained excellent results, peaking on three song charts.

In the music awards ceremony at the end of 2014, Hui's single "Shelter" won awards at the Metro Radio Hit Awards, RTHK Top 10 Gold Songs Awards and JSG  Best 10 Awards Presentation, while Hui himself also won singer awards. His album The Times is one of the top ten best-selling Cantopop albums of the year.

In 2015, Alfred Hui released Colour By Numbers and Watermark albums in January and December respectively, each with 11 songs.

In 2016, Alfred Hui did not release any new albums, but released many songs. In early July, Alfred Hui released a single "My Aspiration". This was his first time directing his own music video, starring former ATV veteran actor Nina Paw. The music video attained over 140,000 views within a week. Since September 1, he has briefly participated in the cartoons drawn by cartoonist YY in Headline Daily every Thursday. Since then, the song "My Aspiration" has also become Hui's first song to peak all four song charts since his debut, while another single "If You're Here, I'm There" ranked first on three charts.

In 2017, after Hui's contract with The Voice Entertainment ended, he signed a new four-year contract with Warner Music Hong Kong. On June 12, 2017, he released his first major title "Root" (feat. 2868) after joining the new record label. On October 27, 2017, he released his first album Miraculous Journey after the transfer. Songs included "Blue", "Miraculous Journey", "OCD" and "ADD". The single "Miraculous Journey" ranked first at three song chart, while the other singles "Blue" and "Root" were released in just a few weeks and peaked at one and two charts respectively. In December, Hui released the single "If Only I Can Weep". A series of moving short videos was made to promote the single. In particular, the Thai chapter was more heatedly discussed by Thai netizens.

In February 2018, Hui released a new single "An Actor Prepares", which ranked first at three song charts. He then collaborated with Mark Lui to release a love song named "Devoted Lover". In May, Hui announced that he was preparing for his first concert in Hong Kong Coliseum, which was considered as an achievement by singers in Hong Kong. In August, he held a solo concert KKBOX Simply Me Simply Alfred, where he announced the confirmation of a concert at the Coliseum, which was held on March 23, 2019.

In August 2018, Hui collaborated with RubberBand's Mau Hou Cheong and released a new single "Spare A Listen" as a tribute to Cantopop. In November, he released a new song "Innocence", which was composed and produced by his friend Yu Yat Yiu. In the same month, Hui announced the release of his first self-titled album Alfred Hui on November 27.

In 2019, to commemorate his tenth year since his debut, Hui released his tenth album Ten. The album won the Best Male Artist Album Award at the 43rd RTHK Top 10 Gold Songs Awards.

In 2020, Alfred Hui released a concept album Negative with the theme of "negativity". In the same year, Hui served as one of the judges in the fourth round of ViuTV's King Maker III. His frank and candid performance on the program, along with his eloquent comments received a lot of praise.

At the end of 2020, Alfred Hui won the first "Gold Award for Male Singer" in his singing career at the 2020 Ultimate Song Chart Awards Presentation. The award was regarded as one of the highest achievements in the music industry. Hui was the first male singer who debuted in the 2010s to win the award. His title song "Feebleness" in Negative has also been listed as one of the top ten songs at the Presentation.

On March 17, 2021, Alfred Hui announced on his social network that his contract with Warner Music Hong Kong had officially expired, saying that he would focus his work as a dentist temporarily and plan to explore the Taiwanese music market after the COVID-19 pandemic. On March 31, Hui accepted an interview with TVB, and he was interviewed by TVB for the first time in nearly four years since he left.

On October 4, 2021, Hui announced the establishment of his own record label, Alfrecords. On April 29, 2022, his 34th birthday, he released his 13th album, 2021, his first album since his independence. The album is released as an LP record exclusively and only 1231 limited copies were made. The lyrics of all songs in the album was written by lyricist Albert Leung.

In January 2022, local media reported that ten Canto-pop singers and groups had been put on a blacklist of government-funded broadcaster RTHK, with radio DJs having been ordered not to play their songs. Hui was reportedly on the list.   
In response to a letter by lawmaker Tik Chi-yuen requesting clarification, RTHK wrote: "RTHK has been supporting the development of Chinese pop music. Program hosts choose songs based on professionalism and suitability to the programs."

Discography 
2011: Alfred Hui Debut Album
2012: Blue
2012: Grandit
2013: The Times - First Collection Of Alfred Hui's Songs
2015: Colour by Numbers
2015: Watermark
2017: Miraculous Journey
2017: THE ULTIMATE New + Best Selections
2018: Alfred Hui
2019: Ten
2020: Negative
2022: 2021

Awards 

2008: 1st Runner-Up in "HKU Singing Contest 2008" organized by the University of Hong Kong
2010: "Award for the Highest Popularity" in "The Voice", TVB JADE Channel
2010: "Supervoice" as awarded song, "Jade Solid Gold Distinguished Nomination – 2nd Round", TVB JADE Channel
2010: "My Departure Is Also A Kind Of Love"" as awarded song, "Jade Solid Gold Distinguished Nomination – 3rd Round", TVB JADE Channel
2010: 1st Runner Up in "Approaching The Youngsters – Music Contest 2010" organized by Central Multi Broadcasting (CMB) in Korea
2011: Bronze Award for "Excellent Performance Award", "Jade Solid Gold Prize-Giving Ceremony 2010" organized by TVB JADE Channel (All the team members from "The Voice")
2011: "New Singer Recommendable Award for Emerging Excellence" in "Jade Solid Gold Prize-Giving Ceremony 2010, TVB JADE Channel
2011: "Departure" as awarded song, "Jade Solid Gold Distinguished Nomination – 1st Round", TVB JADE Channel
2011: "Ant" as awarded song, "Jade Solid Gold Distinguished Nomination – 2nd Round", TVB JADE Channel
2011: "Distinguished New Singer Award" in "Gold Award for Mandarin Music 2011"
2011: "Award for the Most Distinguished Young Singer" in "The 8th King of the Solid Singers – Final Round Prize Giving Ceremony" organized by RTHK
2011: "A Close Friend" as "Award for the Most Distinguished Chorus Song" in "The 8th King of the Solid Singers – Final Round Prize Giving Ceremony" organized by RTHK
2011: "Youth Award for the Most Favorite Chorus Song" in "uChannel – I Support Pop Music Circuit – Prize Giving Ceremony 2011"
2011: "Award for Vanguard Young Singer" in "Music Vanguard List – Prize Giving Ceremony 2011"
2011: "A Close Friend" as awarded song, "Jade Solid Gold Distinguished Nomination – 3rd Round", TVB JADE Channel
2011: "Prince Award", "FACE Magazine Trendy Icons & Brand Supporting Awards 2011"
2011: "Ant" as awarded song, "YAHOO! - Popular People Searching Award 2011"
2011: "Award for High Popularity & New Influence", "YAHOO! - Hot People Searching Award 2011"
2011: "Metro Broadcast Award for New Male Singer", "Metro Broadcast Prize Giving Ceremony for Popular Music 2011"
2011: "Ant" as an awarded song for "Metro Broadcast Award for Original & Creative Song", "Metro Broadcast Prize Giving Ceremony for Popular Music 2011"
2012: Gold Award, "903 Music Gold Award for Young Singer", "903 Music Prize Giving Ceremony 2011", Hong Kong Commercial Broadcasting Corporation Limited
2012: "Award for My Most Favourite New Male Singer", "Sina Music Prize Giving Ceremony 2011"
2012: Bronze Award, "Award for New Singer with Greatest Prospect", "The 34th Ten Distinguished Chinese Golden Music Prize-Giving Concert", Radio Television Hong Kong
2012: "The Gold Award for the Most Favorite New Male Singer", "Jade Solid Gold Prize-Giving Ceremony 2011" organized by TVB JADE Channel
2012: "Ant" as the 4th-Prized song among the top ten compositions, "Young D – Final Nomination for Famous Pop Songs 2011"
2012: Gold Award, "Annual Award for Famous New Singer", "Young D – Final Nomination for Famous Pop Songs 2011"
2012: "A Close Friend" as awarded song, Bronze Award in "Annual Award for Famous Chorus Song", "Young D – Final Nomination for Famous Pop Songs 2011"
2012:  "Annual Award for Famous New Singer", "IFPI Award for the Music Discs with the Best Saleability 2011"
2012: "A Trilogy of Departure" as one of the top ten Cantonese CD-albums with the Best saleability, "IFPI Award for the Music Discs with the Best Saleability 2011"
2012: "Award for New Singer" (Hong Kong & Taiwan Region), "Sprite – Pop Music Prize Giving Ceremony 2011"
2012: "My Ideal Wings" as awarded song, "Metro Broadcast Award for Children Song", "Metro Broadcast Prize Giving Ceremony for Children Songs 2011"
2012: "Metro Broadcast Award for the Best Male Singer in Children Songs", "Metro Broadcast Prize Giving Ceremony for Children Songs 2011"
2012: "Mask" as awarded song, "Jade Solid Gold Distinguished Nomination – 1st Round", TVB JADE Channel
2012: "Award for the Best Cantonese New Male Singer" in "The 12th Chinese Music Media Awards"
2012: "Metro Broadcast Mandarin Power of New Male Singer Award", "Metro Broadcast Mandarin Power Prize Presentation Ceremony 2012"
2012: "A Close Friend" as awarded song, "Metro Broadcast Mandarin Power Award for Distinguished Ensemble Song", "Metro Broadcast Mandarin Power Prize Presentation Ceremony 2012"
2012: "Yes!! The Most Favourite Male Idol For School Campuses"
2012: "Yes!! The Most Favourite Male Idol For Karaoke Singing"
2012: "Abandon" as awarded song, "TVB8 Award for Golden Song", "TVB8 Golden Songs Prize Presentation Ceremony 2012"
2012: "Close Friend" as awarded song, "TVB8 Award for Best Ensemble Song", "TVB8 Golden Songs Prize Presentation Ceremony 2012"
2012: "Mask" as awarded song, "Award for Hottest Re-Edited Song", "YAHOO! - Hot People Searching Award"
2012: "Grandit" (Re-Growth) as awarded song, "Metro Broadcast Award for Popular Song", "Metro Broadcast Prize Giving Ceremony for Popular Music 2012"
2012: "Mask" as awarded song, "Metro Broadcast Award for Hottest Karaoke Song", "Metro Broadcast Prize Giving Ceremony for Popular Music 2012"
2012: "Mask" as awarded song, "Top Ten Most Popular Songs – 10th Position", "Hong Kong Popular Poll Award for Pop Music Prize Presentation Ceremony 2012"
2012: "Grandit" (Re-Growth) as awarded song, "Top Ten Most Recommended Songs for the Nation", "Canada Hottest Chinese Song Award – Final Round Nomination 2012"
2013: "Grandit" (Re-Growth) as awarded song, "Award for Top Ten Songs", "Jade Solid Gold Prize-Giving Ceremony 2012" organized by TVB JADE Channel
2013: "Mask" as awarded song, "Award for Hottest Re-Edited Songs", "Jade Solid Gold Prize-Giving Ceremony 2012" organized by TVB JADE Channel
2013: "Mask" as awarded song, "SINA Music Award for Hottest Re-Edited Songs", "SINA Music Prize Presentation Ceremony 2012"
2013: "Mask" as awarded song, "Award for Ten Distinguished Chinese Golden Songs", "The 35th Ten Distinguished Chinese Golden Music Prize-Giving Concert", Radio Television Hong Kong
2013: "Award for the Lyric Writers of Ten Distinguished Chinese Golden Songs", "The 35th Ten Distinguished Chinese Golden Music Prize-Giving Concert", Radio Television Hong Kong
2013: "Annual Award for Progress in Pop Music Circiuit", "Avant-Garde Music List Prize Presentation Ceremony 2012"
2013: "Blue" as one of the top ten Cantonese CD-albums with the Best saleability, "IFPI Award for the Music Discs with the Best Saleability 2012"
2013: "Mask" as one of the top ten Cantonese songs with the Best Saleability, "IFPI Award for the Music Discs with the Best Saleability 2012"
2013: "Annual Award for Top Ten Famous Local Singer", "IFPI Award for the Music Discs with the Best Saleability 2012"
2013: "Mask" as awarded song, "Award for Best Re-Edited Pop Song", "The 9th King of the Pop Song – Global Chinese Pop Music Fiesta"
2013: "Grandit" (Re-Growth) as awarded song, "Award for Best Cantonese Pop Song", "The 9th King of the Pop Song – Global Chinese Pop Music Fiesta"
2013: "Grandit" (Re-Growth) as awarded song, "Metro Broadcast Award for Children Song", "Metro Broadcast Prize Giving Ceremony for Children Songs 2012"
2013: "Metro Broadcast Award for the Best Male Singer in Children Songs", "Metro Broadcast Prize Giving Ceremony for Children Songs 2012"
2013: "The Ode of Youth" as awarded song, "Jade Solid Gold Distinguished Nomination – 1st Round", TVB JADE Channel
2013: "The Ode of Youth – Mandarin Version" as awarded song, "Metro Broadcast Mandarin Power Award for Distinguished Song", "Metro Broadcast Mandarin Power Prize Presentation Ceremony 2013"
2013: "YAHOO! Shine Award for Celebrity of Cover Page", "YAHOO! Shine Awards 2013", YAHOO!
2013: "Negative Excuses" as awarded song, "TVB8 Award for Golden Song", "TVB8 Golden Songs Prize Presentation Ceremony 2013"
2013: "Award for the Healthiest Idol in Students' Impression", "Beacon College Trendy Index – The Student Popular Poll of Metro Broadcast Prize Giving Ceremony for Popular Music 2013"
2013: "Award for Popular Male Singer", "Metro Broadcast Prize Giving Ceremony for Popular Music 2013
2014: "The Ode of Youth" as awarded song, 3rd Place among the Ten Distinguished Songs based on 903's Professional Recommendations, "903 Music Prize Giving Ceremony 2013", Hong Kong Commercial Broadcasting Corporation Limited
2014: Bronze Award for "903 Awards for Most Famous Male Singers", "903 Music Prize Giving Ceremony 2013", Hong Kong Commercial Broadcasting Corporation Limited
2014: "The Ode of Youth" as awarded song, "Award for Ten Distinguished Chinese Golden Songs", "The 36th Ten Distinguished Chinese Golden Music Prize-Giving Concert 2013", Radio Television Hong Kong
2014: "Award for Distinguished Pop Singer", "The 36th Ten Distinguished Chinese Golden Music Prize-Giving Concert 2013", Radio Television Hong Kong
2014: "The Ode of Youth" as awarded song, "JSG Award for Top Ten Awarded Songs", Jade Solid Gold Prize-Giving Ceremony 2013" organized by TVB JADE Channel
2014: "A Dwelling Shelter" as awarded song, "JSG Award for Top Ten Awarded Songs", Jade Solid Gold Prize-Giving Ceremony 2013" organized by TVB JADE Channel
2014: "Grandit" (Re-Growth) as one of the top ten Cantonese pop songs with the best saleability, "IFPI Award for the Music Discs with the Best Saleability 2013"
2014: "Times" as awarded song, "Jade Solid Gold Distinguished Nomination – 1st Round", TVB JADE Channel
2014: "Shelter" as awarded song, "Jade Solid Gold Distinguished Nomination – 1st Round", TVB JADE Channel
2014: "The Ode of Youth" as the Most Popular Song, "The 1st Cantonese Pop Song Prize Giving Ceremony"
2014: "The Ode of Youth" as the awarded song with the best MV episodes, "The 1st Cantonese Pop Song Prize Giving Ceremony"
2014: "Man of the Year" award, "ELLE MEN 1st Anniversary Celebration Banquet" & "Fashion Objects of Desire Awards Presentation"
2014: "Shelter" as the most popular theme song for television film, "YAHOO! Awards for the Most Popular Singer 2014"
2014: "Award for the Distinguished Pop Star within Hong Kong level (Hong Kong)", "Global Chinese Pop Songs Prize Giving Ceremony"
2014: "Shelter" as the one of the 20 awarded golden songs, "Global Chinese Pop Songs Prize Giving Ceremony"
2014: Award for the Annual Avant-Garde Musician with the Best Performances", "Avant-Garde Music List Prize Presentation Ceremony 2014"
2014: "Shelter" as the Most Popular MV Video, Avant-Garde Music List Prize Presentation Ceremony 2014
2014: "Invisible Locks" as awarded song, "Jade Solid Gold Distinguished Nomination – 2nd Round", TVB JADE Channel
2014: "Auspiciousness" as awarded song, "Jade Solid Gold Distinguished Nomination – 2nd Round", TVB JADE Channel
2014: "Metro Broadcast Award for Distinguished Male Singer", "Metro Broadcast Prize Giving Ceremony for Popular Music 2014"
2014: "Shelter" as awarded song, "Metro Broadcast Prize Giving Ceremony for Popular Music 2014"
2014: Gold Award for "Metro Broadcast Award for Distinguished Performances and Interpretations", "Metro Broadcast Prize Giving Ceremony for Popular Music 2014"
2015: "Shelter" as awarded song, "Award for Ten Distinguished Chinese Golden Songs", "The 37th Ten Distinguished Chinese Golden Music Prize-Giving Concert 2014", Radio Television Hong Kong
2015: "Award for Distinguished Pop Singer", "The 37th Ten Distinguished Chinese Golden Music Prize-Giving Concert 2014", Radio Television Hong Kong
2015: "Invisible Locks" as awarded song, "Jade Solid Gold Prize-Giving Ceremony 2014" organized by TVB JADE Channel
2015: "Shelter" as awarded song, "Jade Solid Gold Prize-Giving Ceremony 2014" organized by TVB JADE Channel
2015: "Award for Distinguished Performance", "Jade Solid Gold Prize-Giving Ceremony 2014" organized by TVB JADE Channel
2015: "Shelter" – Mandarin Version", "TVB8 Award for Golden Song", "TVB8 Golden Songs Prize Presentation Ceremony 2014"
2015: "Award for the Most Popular Male Singer", "TVB8 Golden Songs Prize Presentation Ceremony 2014"
2015: "The Times – New Songs + Best Selections" (The Times 時光 - 新曲 + 精選) as one of the top ten Cantonese music albums with the best saleability, "IFPI Award for the Music Discs with the Best Saleability 2014"
2021: "Feebleness" - one of the Top 10 awarded golden songs organized by VivTV, 《Chill Club》, presented on Apr 18, 2021

References

External links 
Alfred Hui at Sina Weibo
Alfred Hui at Instagram

1988 births
Living people
Cantonese people
Hong Kong male singers
Cantopop singers
Alumni of the University of Hong Kong
Hong Kong male television actors
21st-century Hong Kong male actors
Hong Kong dentists